Schuylkill Township could refer to the following places in the U.S. state of Pennsylvania:
Schuylkill Township, Chester County, Pennsylvania.
Schuylkill Township, Schuylkill County, Pennsylvania.

Pennsylvania township disambiguation pages